The Black Lion (Georgian:  Shavi Lomi) is a professional Georgian rugby union team based in Tbilisi that competes annually in the Rugby Europe Super Cup Eastern Conference competition along with Romanian Wolves and Tel Aviv Heat and fellow Georgian team Batumi RC.
They also compete in the Currie Cup First Division in South Africa.

Name

The name of the franchise has several inspirations. The players of the national team are sometimes nicknamed the lions, in reference to an (unofficial) anthem of the national team, which says: "freedom is the property of the lions". Also this is similar to the Georgian Rugby Union's slogan, "Freedom is a lion's destiny". The second inspiration comes from Georgian artist Niko Pirosmani, one of whose most famous works is the painting Black Lion. The club logo is a reinterpretation of the lion's face.

History
The franchise was created in 2021 to participate in the Rugby Europe Super Cup. It is owned by the Georgian Federation, which employs the players. All the players are without clubs or playing in the Georgia league (Didi 10). Players are made available to Didi 10 clubs when they have no obligations with their franchise, up to a limit of 4 per club. Georgian club joins into Currie Cup First Division since 2022.

Awards
Rugby Europe Super Cup 2021-2022, 2022

Current squad

Coaches

Current coaching staff
The current coaching staff for the Black Lion team:

See also
 Georgia national rugby union team
 Rugby union in Georgia
 Tbilisi Caucasians
 :Category:The Black Lion players

References

External links

Rugby union teams from Georgia (country)
Rugby clubs established in 2021
Sport in Tbilisi
Rugby Europe Super Cup
2021 establishments in Georgia (country)